Tinerkouk is a town in central Algeria.

Localities  of the commune 
The commune is composed of 7 localities:

References

Communes of Adrar Province